Emam Hasan-e Olya (also Romanized as Emām Ḩasan-e ‘Olyā; also known as Emām Ḩasan, Emām Ḩasan-e Bālā, Emām Ḩassan-e Bālā, Īmām Hasan, and Īmān Hassan) is a village in Nasrabad Rural District (Kermanshah Province), in the Central District of Qasr-e Shirin County, Kermanshah Province, Iran. At the 2006 census, its population was 80, in 19 families. The village is populated by Kurds.

References 

Populated places in Qasr-e Shirin County
Kurdish settlements in Kermanshah Province